Monte Confinale (3,370m), is a mountain of the Ortler Alps in Lombardy, northern Italy.

Located in the Stelvio National Park east of Bormio, it is usually climbed from the nearby Forni hotel at 2,178 m in altitude or lower down from the village of Santa Caterina di Valfurva to the northeast.

References

Mountains of the Alps
Alpine three-thousanders
Mountains of Lombardy